The Caffrey and Davis Furniture Company-Senior Hotel at 296 S. Main St. in Springville, Utah was built in 1900.  It has also been known as Caffrey and Davis Furniture Company and as Robinson Bros. Music Co..  It was listed on the National Register of Historic Places in 1998.

The building was first a furniture and music store, then a billiard parlor during approximately 1920 to 1928, and then a hotel into the 1960s.

References

Commercial buildings completed in 1900
Commercial buildings on the National Register of Historic Places in Utah
Hotel buildings on the National Register of Historic Places in Utah
Romanesque Revival architecture in Utah
Buildings and structures in Springville, Utah
National Register of Historic Places in Utah County, Utah
Individually listed contributing properties to historic districts on the National Register in Utah